The Manawatu Jets are a New Zealand basketball team based in Palmerston North. The Jets compete in the National Basketball League (NBL) and play their home games at Central Energy Trust Arena. For sponsorship reasons, they are known as the Property Brokers Manawatu Jets.

Team history
The Palmerston North Jets were a foundation member of the National Basketball League (NBL) in 1982. After finishing eighth in the eight-team competition, the Jets were relegated to the second-tiered Conference Basketball League (CBL) in 1983. After finishing as CBL runners-up in 1984, they were promoted back into the NBL in 1985. They finished fifth in both 1985 and 1986, but after finishing tenth in the ten-team competition in 1987, the Jets were relegated to the CBL in 1988. The 1988 season saw the Jets win the CBL championship, which saw them promoted back into the NBL in 1989. The Jets were regular season winners in 1989, but despite being the top seed at the finals weekend, they were defeated 92–84 in the semifinal by the Canterbury Rams. In 1992, the Jets reached the NBL final, where they were defeated 79–71 by the Rams. In 2002, the team became known as the Manawatu Jets.

In November 2015, the Jets withdrew from the NBL due to reduced funding and an unsustainable business model. In April 2017, the Jets lodged their application to Basketball New Zealand to compete in the 2018 NBL season. Their application was successful, and on 29 August 2017, the Jets were readmitted into the league.

In 2020, the Jets reached the NBL final for the second time in their history, where they lost 79–77 to the Otago Nuggets.

Players

Current roster

Notable past players

  /  Ed Book
  /  Tony Brown
  /  Tyrone Brown
  /  Willie Burton
  David Cooper
  Brad Davidson
  Chris Hagan
  Kaine Hokianga
  /  Nick Horvath
  /  James Hunter
  /  Marcel Jones
  /  Luke Martin
  DeWayne McCray
  Kent Mori
  Mika Vukona
  Josh Pace
  Miles Pearce
  Brendon Polyblank
  Dylan Rigdon
  Jamil Terrell
  Jeremiah Trueman
  Rob Tuilave

References

External links
 Official team website
 Manawatu Jets could return to NBL in 2018

Basketball teams established in 1982
Basketball teams in New Zealand
National Basketball League (New Zealand) teams
Sport in Palmerston North
1982 establishments in New Zealand